KF Reçica (FK Rečica) is a football club based in the village of Reçicë e Madhe, Tetovo, North Macedonia. They are currently competing in the Macedonian Third League (West Division).

History
The club was founded in 1979.

External links
Club info at MacedonianFootball 
Football Federation of Macedonia 

Recica
Association football clubs established in 1979
1979 establishments in the Socialist Republic of Macedonia
FK
Reçica